The Albert Gallatin Area School District is a large, rural, public school district located in Fayette County, Pennsylvania. It is named after Albert Gallatin former U.S. Secretary of the Treasury, planner of the Lewis and Clark expedition, engineer of the financial details of the Louisiana Purchase, and founder of New York University. It serves the Boroughs of Masontown, Fairchance, Point Marion, and Smithfield. It also serves German, Springhill, Georges, and Nicholson Townships. According to 2000 US federal census data, Albert Gallatin Area School District serves a resident population of 25,282. By 2010, the District's population declined to 23,852 people. The educational attainment levels for the Albert Gallatin Area School District population (25 years old and over) were 82.4% high school graduates and 11.9% college graduates. The District is one of the 500 public school districts of Pennsylvania.

According to the Pennsylvania Budget and Policy Center, 61.4% of Albert Gallatin Area School District's pupils lived at 185% or below the Federal Poverty Level  as shown by their eligibility for the federal free or reduced price school meal programs in 2012. In 2013, the Pennsylvania Department of Education, reported that 24 students in the Albert Gallatin Area School District were homeless.

In 2009, Albert Gallatin Area School District residents’ per capita income was $14,454, while the median family income was $31,607. In the Commonwealth, the median family income was 
$49,501 and the United States median family income was $49,445, in 2010. In Fayette County, the median household income was $39,115. By 2013, the median household income in the United States rose to $52,100. In 2014, the median household income in the USA was $53,700.

Recent building improvements include a state-of-the-art stadium grass playing fieldThe school mascot is the Colonial.  The school is locally known by its initials, AG.

History
Albert Gallatin Area School District was created as an original merger between Masontown and Point Marion High Schools in 1958, creating a new Senior High School in Friendship Hill and the former schools becoming Elementary and Junior High Schools.

In 1958, Fairchance High School and Georges High School consolidated to become Fairchance-Georges High School. These two joint school boards along with several other local school boards became part of a state consolidation plan in 1966, creating the Albert Gallatin Area School District while retaining three separate high schools: Albert Gallatin, Fairchance-Georges and German Township.

In 1987, a second consolidation was made creating the Tri-Valley High School as the sole Senior High School for the district, utilizing the old Fairchance-Geroges building. The former Albert Gallatin High School became Albert Gallatin Junior High South while German Township became Albert Gallatin Junior High School North.

The Mascot for North was the Lions and Eagles was the mascot for the South with the idea that when the two schools combined at the senior high would become the Griffins.

In 1993, retaining the same secondary building composition, the High School's name was renamed to Albert Gallatn. Since then, many of the schools have been upgraded including the Senior High and the Junior Highs became Middle Schools after their respective renovations (George J Plava - German Central in 1989, South and Friendship Hill Elementary in 1999 and North in 2004, respectively.) Other schools were replaced including Masontown Elementary (1999) and A.L. Wilson (2008 - A merger of the former Fairchance Elementary and Windy Hill School.

Unfortunately, other schools have been shuttered over the decades including Point Marion Elementary and later Junior High (1980s) and D. Ferd Swaney Elementary (2016).

Schools
Albert Gallatin Area School District currently operates: five elementary schools, two middle schools, and one senior high school.
Albert Gallatin High School 
Albert Gallatin South Middle School
Albert Gallatin North Middle School
A.L. Wilson Elementary School
Friendship Hill Elementary School
George J. Plava Elementary School
Masontown Elementary School
Smithfield Elementary School

Extracurriculars
The district offers a wide variety of clubs, activities and an extensive sports program.

The football program left the WPIAL and became an independent team in 2019.

Sports
The District funds:

Boys
Baseball - AAAA
Basketball- AAAA
Cross Country - AAA
Football - AAA
Golf - AAA
Soccer - AAA
Track and Field - AAA
Wrestling - AAA

Girls
Basketball - AAA
Cross Country - AAA
Soccer (Fall) - AAA
Softball - AAA
Track and Field - AAA
Volleyball - AAA

According to PIAA directory July 2012

References

External links
Albert Gallatin Area School District website

School districts in Fayette County, Pennsylvania
1951 establishments in Pennsylvania